The 2002–03 Lega Basket Serie A, known as the Foxy Cup for sponsorship reasons, was the 81st season of the Lega Basket Serie A, the highest professional basketball league in Italy.

The regular season ran from 22 September 2002 to 3 May 2003, the playoffs ran from 7 May 2003 to 17 June 2003.

Benetton Treviso won their 4th title after beating Skipper Bologna 3–1 in the finals series.

Regular season

Individual Statistics, Regular Season

Points

Assists

Rebounds

Playoffs 
{{#invoke:RoundN|main|columns=4||3rdplace=no|nowrap=yes
|skipmatch1=yes|skipmatch3=yes|skipmatch5=yes|skipmatch7=yes

|Treviso|-|Bye|-
||Roseto|1|Reggio Calabria|2||Siena|-|Bye|-
||Milano|1|Varese|2||Roma|-|Bye|-
||Napoli|2|Biella|1
||Cantù|-|Bye|-
||Bologna|2|Trieste|0

||Treviso|3|Reggio Calabria|2
||Siena|3|Varese|0
||Roma|3|Pompea Napoli|1
||Cantù|1|Bologna|3

||Treviso|3|Siena|1
||Roma|2|Bologna|3

||Treviso|3|Bologna|1
}}1/8 Finals Metis Varese - Pippo Milano 2-1 (66-65, 79-55, 60-59)
 Skipper Bologna - Acegas Trieste 2-0 (89-67, 85-68)
 Pompea Napoli - Lauretana Biella 2-1 (84-60, 92-107, 95-92)
 Viola Reggio Calabria - Euro Roseto 2-1 (76-90, 86-82, 75-71)

Bye: Benetton Treviso, Lottomatica Roma, Oregon Scientific Cantù, Montepaschi SienaQuarterfinals Benetton Treviso - Viola Reggio Calabria 3-2 (73-74, 58-65, 97-70, 71-69, 79-59)
 Lottomatica Roma - Pompea Napoli 3-1 (77-72, 84-70, 75-97, 105-92)
 Skipper Bologna - Oregon Scientific Cantù 3-1 (74-77, 95-93, 102-87, 86-77)
 Montepaschi Siena - Metis Varese 3-0 (73-65, 76-73, 72-60)Semifinals Benetton Treviso - Montepaschi Siena 3-1 (91-89, 81-78, 74-86, 73-66)
 Skipper Bologna - Lottomatica Roma 3-2 (62-71, 83-80, 89-96, 88-81, 77-75)Finals Benetton Treviso - Skipper Bologna 3-1 (90-86, 67-73, 87-62, 84-80)

AwardsMost Valuable Player: Massimo Bulleri (Benetton Treviso)Coach of the year:'''
 Lino Lardo (Viola Reggio Calabria)

Notes

References

Lega Basket Serie A seasons
1
Italy